Kyrkjebønosi  is a mountain that lies north of Hemsedal in Buskerud, Norway.

References

External links
Kyrkjebønosi (haramfjell.com)

Mountains of Viken